Wadeye is a town in Australia's Northern Territory. It was formerly known (and is still often referred to) as Port Keats. Wadeye is the 6th most populous town, and the largest Indigenous community in the Northern Territory.

History
Aboriginal Australians who inhabited the area long before white settlement include seven language groups, with the main language spoken being Murrinh-patha.

Due to the opportunities that the mission provided for the people in the area, and the limited space and facilities at the mission, Father Docherty had to turn some people away until the mission's facilities and gardens could provide for large numbers of people. The mission was populated by people from seven different language groups and more than 20 clans. The Australian Government took over at some point and managed the mission as an Aboriginal reserve until the late 1970s.

In 1978, local government was handed to the Kardu Numida Council and the community was renamed Wadeye.

In 2022, mass unrest started over the death of a 32-year-old man on April 19, after he was allegedly attacked by an 18-year-old man. The teen was charged with manslaughter. Violence escalated between the 22 clan groups over the incident that resulted in a man reportedly being killed with a spear in the head, a total of 37 homes being extensively damaged by fire in arson attacks and 125 of Wadeye's 288 properties needing repairs according to the Northern Territory government. All told, 545 residents have been forced from their homes since tensions escalated in April with violence still ongoing. In June 2022, total of sixteen eight bows and six crossbows were stolen in Darwin and used in Wadeye to injure at least four men.

Location and access
The Fitzmaurice River more or less forms its southern boundary.

It lies close to the Hyland Bay and Moyle Floodplain Important Bird Area, identified as such by BirdLife International because of its importance for large numbers of waterbirds.

Wadeye has a sealed airstrip, Port Keats Airfield, with regular passenger flights to Darwin. Road access is mostly unsealed via the Port Keats/ Daly River Road. Wadeye is only accessible by road during the dry season as the wet season renders many river crossings impassable, and access is only possible by light aircraft or coastal barge.

Facilities 
Wadeye is serviced by several organisations including government and non-government organisations. There is a Catholic school operated by Our Lady of the Sacred Heart that provides education to students from transition through to year 12. In 2020, despite the COVID-19 pandemic, seven students completed high school in Wadeye. It was the first time since 2007 that anyone had completed the final year.

There is a clinic operated by the Northern Territory Government that provides primary health care and emergency care services for the community. Clients requiring care that is not able to be managed in the community are transferred to Royal Darwin Hospital via the Top End Medical Retrieval Service operated by CareFlight.

The development corporation for the community is Thammarurr Development Corporation (TDC), which represents the local 21 clan groups, providing funding, governance and leadership around issues surrounding community development related to health, housing, education and country.

There is a well stocked shop and a take-away operated by the TDC.

Wadeye is also the site of a temporary ADF Radar site that is used during exercises conducted in the Top End.

Art and culture
Nym Bunduk was the first painter in Wadeye who had international interest. He was asked by Bill Stanner, an anthropologist who had come with Richard Docherty in 1935, to produce pieces explaining traditional law, which he made after he saw a map produced by Stanner. He produced many bark paintings of the dreaming which informed Stanner's research. In the 1958 George Chaloupka commissioned 64 paintings by local artists including Nym Bunduk, Charlie Mardigan and Charlie Brinken. By the 1960s the Catholic Mission was buying artworks from local artists at the mission store. Bark painting soon became a small mission-run cottage industry. Today in Wadeye Mark Crocomb follows in the footsteps of Stanner collecting history and languages before they are lost. Following in the tradition of Nym Bundak is Richard 'Skunky' Parmbuk. He is one of many artists filling the space left by Nym in Wadeye.

Climate
As any other regions in the Top End, Wadeye has a tropical savanna climate (Aw) with distinct wet and dry seasons. The dry season normally occurs from about May to October. The temperature of the dry season can drop below  during the coolest months between May and August, and it can peak above  in the build up months between September to November. The wet season is generally associated with monsoon rains and tropical cyclones. Most of the rainfall occurs from December to March (southern hemisphere summer), when thunderstorms are not very uncommon and afternoon relative humidity averages over 70 percent during the wettest months.

References

 

Towns in the Northern Territory
Aboriginal communities in the Northern Territory
Australian Aboriginal missions